The 2009–10 Argentine Torneo Argentino A was the fifteenth season of third division professional football in Argentina. A total of 25 teams competed; the champion was promoted to Primera B Nacional.

Club information

Zone A

1 Play their home games at Estadio José María Minella.

Zone B

Zone C

Torneo Apertura 2009

First stage

Zone A

Zone B

Zone C

Second stage

Group A

Group B

Torneo Clausura 2010

First stage

Zone A

Zone B

Zone C

Second stage

Pentagonal A

Pentagonal B

Final stage

Semifinals

Final

Promotion/relegation playoff B Nacional-Torneo Argentino A

C.A.I remained in the Primera B Nacional by winning the playoff.

Relegation Matches

|-
!colspan="5"|Relegation/promotion playoff 1

|-
!colspan="5"|Relegation/promotion playoff 2

Alumni (VM) remained in the Torneo Argentino A by winning the playoff.
Villa Mitre remained in the Torneo Argentino A by drawing the playoff.

See also
2009–10 in Argentine football

References

Torneo Argentino A seasons
3